Don Pedro is a Mexican restaurant in San Antonio, Texas. The readers of the San Antonio Express-News have several times voted it the best Mexican restaurant in San Antonio.

History
Opened in 1968, "currently employs more than 150 full and part time workers serving over 12,500 customers on average per week. Don Pedro has added a new  dining room with a full bar, bringing the total seating capacity to 350 persons."  The restaurant is owned by Ruben Sepulveda Sr. and his family.

References

External links

Restaurant web site

Restaurants in San Antonio
Mexican-American culture in San Antonio
Mexican restaurants in Texas
Restaurants established in 1968
1968 establishments in Texas